This article covers various topics involving alcoholic drinks in Canada. The Government of Canada defines an alcoholic drink as "a beverage containing 1.1% or more alcohol by volume."

History

Comparative consumption
Statistics Canada carries out surveys of alcoholic consumption in Canada, divided by territory/province. Average values for the country in 2006 are given in the bottom row of the table.

Distribution
Under the Constitution of Canada, responsibility for enacting laws and regulations regarding the sale and distribution of alcoholic drinks in Canada is the sole responsibility of the ten provinces.  Canada's three territories have also been granted similar autonomy over these matters under the provisions of federal legislation.

This means that there is a separate agency (or agencies) in each province responsible for regulating the consumption of and, in all but one case, the sale of alcoholic drinks.  Alberta is currently the only jurisdiction to have completely privatized its retail liquor industry (the AGLC maintains a monopoly over the wholesale distribution of wine, distilled spirits and imported beer — the distribution operation itself being contracted out to a private operator).  Most of the other jurisdictions have maintained a total or near-total control over the sale of hard liquor while allowing limited privatisation of country-originated beer and wine sales.

Legal issues

Age
In Canada, there is no federally defined age for legal alcohol purchase or consumption. Each province and territory is free to set its own drinking age. The legal age for purchase is:
19 years of age in British Columbia, New Brunswick, Newfoundland and Labrador, Northwest Territories, Nova Scotia, Nunavut, Ontario, PEI, Saskatchewan, and Yukon.
18 years of age in Alberta, Manitoba, and Quebec

Sales
The selling hours of alcohol, both on and off-premises, are also appointed by provincial and territorial jurisdiction, as long as off-premises sale hours do not coincide with curfew hours. Many provinces and territories define the off-premises sale of hard liquor, either by alcohol volume or by quantities thereof, to be sold only within specific hours, which usually correspond to the opening hours of a given vendor. However, in some of them, it is also possible to derogate to the current norm upon applying for a distributor's licence, under certain circumstances. The on-premises sale is allowed at the discretion of the premise, with the hours being regulated by every province.

In general, most provinces have banned "tied houses" (bars that are affiliated with only one alcohol supplier), in favour of free houses which sell products from a variety of suppliers.  A partial exception is made for brewpubs where a bar and brewery are on the same site.

Consumption
The consumption of alcohol in public places is generally forbidden, regardless of the time (in a few provinces and territories this is still not enforced), unless a permit to do so is delivered by the responsible municipal authorities. In Quebec the consumption of drinks with low alcohol contents is permitted in public if accompanied by food. In all of the provinces and territories, the consumption of alcohol is forbidden while driving, with Ontario and Quebec also forbidding the possession of open non-empty containers within a motionless vehicle. Police in Canada are known to show considerable discretion to public consumption based on the amount of public disruption.

See also
Alcoholic drink
Caesar (cocktail)
Legal drinking age
Queen Mary (beer cocktail)

Notes

Sources
 

Alcohol in Canada
Drinking culture